Vavad may refer to:
 Vavad, India
 Vavad, Iran